Mutation–selection balance is an equilibrium in the number of deleterious alleles in a population that occurs when the rate at which deleterious alleles are created by mutation equals the rate at which deleterious alleles are eliminated by selection. The majority of genetic mutations are neutral or deleterious; beneficial mutations are relatively rare. The resulting influx of deleterious mutations into a population over time is counteracted by negative selection, which acts to purge deleterious mutations. Setting aside other factors (e.g., balancing selection, and genetic drift), the equilibrium number of deleterious alleles is then determined by a balance between the deleterious mutation rate and the rate at which selection purges those mutations.

Mutation–selection balance was originally proposed to explain how genetic variation is maintained in populations, although several other ways for deleterious mutations to persist are now recognized, notably balancing selection. Nevertheless, the concept is still widely used in evolutionary genetics, e.g. to explain the persistence of deleterious alleles as in the case of spinal muscular atrophy, or, in theoretical models, mutation-selection balance can appear in a variety of ways and has even been applied to beneficial mutations (i.e. balance between selective loss of variation and creation of variation by beneficial mutations).

Haploid population

Suppose that deleterious mutations from A to B occur at rate , and the reverse beneficial mutation from B to A occurs rarely enough to be negligible (e.g. because the mutation rate is so low that  is small). Then, each generation selection eliminates deleterious mutants reducing  by an amount , while mutation creates more deleterious alleles increasing  by an amount . Thus, provided that the mutant allele is not weakly deleterious (very small ) and the mutation rate is not very high, the equilibrium frequency of the deleterious allele will be small.

Diploid population

For simplicity, suppose that mating is random.

The degree of dominance affects the relative importance of selection on heterozygotes versus homozygotes. If A is not completely dominant (i.e.  is not close to zero), then deleterious mutations are primarily removed by selection on heterozygotes because heterozygotes contain the vast majority of deleterious B alleles (assuming that the deleterious mutation rate  is not very large). This case is approximately equivalent to the preceding haploid case, where mutation converts normal homozygotes to heterozygotes at rate  and selection acts on heterozygotes with selection coefficient ; thus .

In the case of complete dominance, deleterious alleles are only removed by selection on BB homozygotes. Let ,  and  be the frequencies of the corresponding genotypes. The frequency  of normal alleles A increases at rate  due to the selective elimination of recessive homozygotes, while mutation causes  to decrease at rate  (ignoring back mutations). This equilibrium frequency is potentially substantially larger than for the case of partial dominance, because a large number of mutant alleles are carried in heterozygotes and are shielded from selection.

Many properties of a non random mating population can be explained by a random mating population whose effective population size is adjusted. However, in non-steady state population dynamics there can be a lower prevalence for recessive disorders in a random mating population during and after a growth phase.

See also

 Negative selection
 Dysgenics
 Viral quasispecies

References

Mutation
Selection